Hickory is a small rural unincorporated community located within the independent city of Chesapeake in the U.S. state of Virginia. Hickory lies in the southern portion of the city and is adjacent to the North Carolina-Virginia border.  Most of Hickory is either rural farmland or wealthy suburban neighborhoods.

Hickory High School is where New York Mets star David Wright matriculated from.
Its school colors are teal, gray, black, and white. Its school mascot is a hawk.  The school once made news when students held a "Confederacy Day" parade on the front lawn.  However, it continues to rank at the top of Virginia schools for test scores and overall academic quality and rigor.

References 

Chesapeake, Virginia communities
Unincorporated communities in Virginia